Dick Gunnar Lidman (born 24 January 1967) is a Swedish former footballer who played as a midfielder. During his club career, Lidman played for Skellefteå AIK, GIF Sundsvall, AIK, and Slavia Prague. He made two appearances for the Sweden national team in 1995.

Honours
AIK
 Swedish Champion: 1992
 Svenska Cupen: 1995-96, 1996-97
Slavia Prague

 Czech First League: 1995–96

External links

1967 births
Living people
Swedish footballers
Association football midfielders
Skellefteå FF players
GIF Sundsvall players
AIK Fotboll players
SK Slavia Prague players
Sweden international footballers
People from Skellefteå Municipality
Sportspeople from Västerbotten County